The Kharia language ( or ) is a Munda language of the Austroasiatic language family, that is primarily spoken by the Kharia people of eastern India.

History
According to linguist Paul Sidwell, Austroasiatic languages arrived on the coast of Odisha from Southeast Asia about 4000-3500 years ago.

Classification
Kharia belongs to the Kharia–Juang branch of the Munda language family. Its closest extant relative is the Juang language, but the relationship between Kharia and Juang is remote.

The most widely cited classification places Kharia and Juang together as a subgroup of the South Munda branch of the Munda family. However, some earlier classification schemes placed Kharia and Juang together, as an independent branch deriving from the root of the Munda languages, which they named Central Munda.

Kharia is in contact with Sadri (the local lingua franca), Mundari, Kurukh, Hindi, and Odia (in Odisha).

Distribution
Kharia speakers are located in the following districts of India.

Jharkhand
Simdega district
Gumla district
Chhattisgarh
Surguja district
Raigarh district
Odisha
Sundargarh district
Jharsuguda district

Phonology

References

Peterson, John. 2008. "Kharia". In Anderson, Gregory D.S (ed). The Munda languages, 434–507. Routledge Language Family Series 3.New York: Routledge. .

External links
Online Kharia Dictionary

Munda languages
Languages of India
Endangered languages of India